Aleksandr Chestnikh (born 17 November 1974) is a former pair skater who competed internationally for Armenia and Georgia. He represented Armenia with partner Maria Krasiltseva. They placed 19th at the 1998 Winter Olympics. Chestnikh then switched to skate for Georgia with partner Evgenia Filonenko. They placed 16th at the 2000 European and World Figure Skating Championships.

References
 Pairs on Ice: Maria Krasiltseva / Aleksandr Chestnikh
 Pairs on Ice: Evgenia Filonenko / Aleksandr Chestnikh

1974 births
Living people
Figure skaters from Moscow
Male pair skaters from Georgia (country)
Olympic figure skaters of Armenia
Figure skaters at the 1998 Winter Olympics
Pair skaters
Armenian figure skaters